XView is a widget toolkit from Sun Microsystems introduced in 1988. It provides an OPEN LOOK user interface for X Window System applications, with an object-oriented application programming interface (API) for the C programming language.  Its interface, controls, and layouts are very close to that of the earlier SunView window system, making it easy to convert existing applications from SunView to X. Sun also produced the User Interface Toolkit (UIT), a C++ API to XView.

The XView source code has been freely available since the early 1990s, making it the "first open-source professional-quality X Window System toolkit".  XView was later abandoned by Sun in favor of Motif (the basis of CDE), and more recently GTK+ (the basis of GNOME).

XView was reputedly the first system to use right-button context menus, which are now ubiquitous among computer user interfaces.

See also 
 OLIT
 MoOLIT
 OpenWindows

References

Further reading 
 Ian Darwin, et al, X Window System User's Guide, OPEN LOOK Edition (O'Reilly & Associates, unpublished) Volume 3OL
 Dan Heller, XView Programming Manual (O'Reilly & Associates, 1991)  Volume 7
 Thomas Van Raalte, ed. XView Reference Manual (O'Reilly & Associates, 1991)  Volume 7b

Widget toolkits
Sun Microsystems software
X-based libraries